Zhang Sishi (born 7 December 1993) is a Chinese swimmer. She competed in the women's 200 metre individual medley event at the 2017 World Aquatics Championships.

References

External links
 

1993 births
Living people
Place of birth missing (living people)
Universiade medalists in swimming
Universiade gold medalists for China
Medalists at the 2015 Summer Universiade
Chinese female medley swimmers
21st-century Chinese women